Midfield is the part of a sports pitch that lies approximately in the center.

Midfield may also refer to:

 Midfield, Alabama, United States, a town
 Midfield High School
 Midfield, County Mayo, Ireland, a village
 Midfield, Highland, Scotland, a hamlet
 Midfield, Texas, United States, an unincorporated community
 The midfield, the group of midfielders in a team

See also
 Midfielder (disambiguation)